David Lopez (born June 3, 1951) is a former American telecommunications executive who served as the Oklahoma Secretary of State after having previously served as the Oklahoma Secretary of Commerce under Republican Governor of Oklahoma Mary Fallin.

In March, 2017, Governor Fallin appointed Lopez as Secretary of State and he was confirmed by the Oklahoma Senate in May, 2017.  In January, 2018, Lopez' duties were expanded and his title was changed to Secretary of State, Education and Workforce Development.  He retained that title until resigning effective March 30, 2018.

Governor Fallin had previously named Lopez to serve as her Oklahoma Secretary of Commerce and Tourism in January, 2011. Lopez was appointed to serve in the dual role of both the Secretary of Commerce and Tourism as well as the Executive Director of the Department of Commerce.  In 2013, Lopez's position was reorganized by separating Commerce agencies from Tourism agencies, retitling his position to simply "Secretary of Commerce".

Lopez resigned as Secretary of Commerce on August 26, 2013 effective August 30, 2013 after being named as the interim Superintendent of Schools for the Oklahoma City Public School District, succeeding Karl Springer.

Biography
Lopez currently serves on the Board of Directors for BancFirst Corporation and for Hall Capital as well as the Advisory Board for Blue Cross-Blue Shield of Oklahoma. Previous corporate boards on which Lopez has served include BOK Financial, American Fidelity Corporation and ITC Holdings.  Non-profit boards on which Lopez serves are the Greater Oklahoma City Chamber of Commerce and United Way of Central Oklahoma.

Lopez received a bachelor's degree and a master's degree from New Mexico State University where he also served as Sports Information Director for five years. He had a 22-year career with SBC Communications, eventually rising to the position of President for the Oklahoma and completed his career as President of Texas for SBC, the predecessor company to AT&T. After retiring from SBC, he returned to Oklahoma where resumed his professional career as President of Downtown Oklahoma City Inc., (a non-profit corporation aimed at revitalizing Oklahoma City's downtown) and he later served as President of American Fidelity Foundation (a non-profit corporation in Oklahoma City that gives grants for economic development, education, human services, and art).

Lopez, a long-time advocate of public education, has served on the board of regents for the Texas Tech University System and on the board of trustees for Oklahoma City Community College.  Honors accorded Lopez include the Dean A. McGee Award (by Downtown Oklahoma City Inc.), the Key Contributor Award (by the Oklahoma Academy for State Goals) and the Champion of Youth Award (by the Boys and Girls Club of Central Oklahoma).  He was inducted into Oklahoma City University’s Commerce and Industry Hall of Honor, Oklahoma Christian University presented Lopez with an honorary Doctor of Humanities Degree and Lopez was inducted into the New Mexico State University Athletics Hall of Fame.

Personal life
Lopez and his wife, Lana, reside in Oklahoma City and have five children and eight grandchildren.

References

External links
Governor Fallin Selects Dave Lopez as Secretary of Commerce, Office of Governor Fallin, 2011-01-27
Fallin names Lopez commerce secretary, Daily Oklahoman, by Michael McNutt, 2011-01-27
Fallin names longtime telecom exec to her Cabinet, Tulsa World, by Barbara Hoberock, 2011-01-27

1952 births
American politicians of Mexican descent
Businesspeople from Oklahoma City
Living people
New Mexico State University alumni
Politicians from Oklahoma City
Secretaries of State of Oklahoma
State cabinet secretaries of Oklahoma